Thecocoelurus is a dubious genus of theropod dinosaur from the early Cretaceous period of England. The phylogenetic placement of this genus is uncertain, and it has been referred to an oviraptosaur, an ornithomimosaur, or a therizinosaur by different researchers throughout its history.

Discovery and naming
Thecocoelurus is known only from half of a single cervical vertebra, discovered by the Rev. William Darwin Fox on the Isle of Wight during the 19th century. After his death the Fox Collection was acquired by the British Museum of Natural History. William Davies was the first to notice the specimen and assumed a close affinity with Coelurus.

It was described by Harry Govier Seeley in 1888. Seeley named the fossil Thecospondylus daviesi, referring it to a genus he had named earlier for the incomplete cast of a sacrum. However, in 1901 Baron Franz Nopcsa renamed it Coelurus daviesi. In 1923 Friedrich von Huene decided that it should be removed from either Thecospondylus or Coelurus and given its own genus, Thecocoelurus. The generic name is a contraction of "Thecospondylus" and "Coelurus".

The holotype, NHMUK PV R181, was found in debris from a layer of the Wessex Formation, dating from the Barremian. It consists of the anterior end, about a third, of a cervical vertebra estimated by Seeley to have been nine centimetres long.

Classification
Von Huene originally assigned Thecocoelurus to the Coeluridae, but in 1926 speculated that due to the not inconsiderable size and typical structure of the vertebra it might belong to a member of the Ornithomimidae. Though it has been since been typically identified as an indeterminate "coelurian" theropod, Thecocoelurus was reidentified by Darren Naish and colleagues in 2001 as a member of the Oviraptorosauria, a group of omnivorous maniraptoran theropods, which would make it the only oviraptorosaur fossil that has ever been found in Europe. Numerous detailed similarities are shared by the specimen and the cervical vertebrae of caenagnathid oviraptorosaurs. Naish et al. also considered Thecocoelurus to be a nomen dubium. In 2004 it was theorized by James Kirkland that Thecocoelurus might not be an oviraptorosaur, but a member of the therizinosaur lineage instead, closely related to Falcarius, again a unique occurrence for Europe.

A 2014 re-evaluation comparing the specimens with European ornithomimosaur fossils found that Thecocoelurus was likely one of the oldest known ornithomimosaurs, and a possible senior synonym of Valdoraptor. However, researchers Micky Mortimer and Darren Naish have expressed doubt on its ornithomimosaur affinities, suggesting instead it may represent a therizinosaur similar to Falcarius.

See also 
 Timeline of ornithomimosaur research

References 

Ornithomimosaurs
Barremian life
Early Cretaceous dinosaurs of Europe
Cretaceous England
Fossils of England
Fossil taxa described in 1923
Taxa named by Friedrich von Huene
Nomina dubia